Thermally activated delayed fluorescence (TADF) is a process through which a molecular species in a non-emitting excited state can incorporate surrounding thermal energy to change states and only then undergo light emission. The TADF process involves an excited molecular species in a triplet state, which commonly has a forbidden transition to the ground state termed phosphorescence. By absorbing nearby thermal energy the triplet state can undergo reverse intersystem crossing (RISC) converting it to a singlet state, which can then de-excite to the ground state and emit light in a process termed fluorescence. Along with fluorescent and phosphorescent compounds, TADF compounds are one of the three main light-emitting materials used in organic light-emitting diodes (OLEDs).

Another type of TADF process has been shown to originate from conformational trapping to a dark state. Thermal energy allows the repopulation of the emissive state resulting in a delayed fluorescence.

History
The first evidence of thermally activated delayed fluorescence in a fully organic molecule was discovered in 1961 using the compound eosin. The emission that was detected was termed "E-type" delayed fluorescence and the mechanism was not completely understood. In 1986, the TADF mechanism was further investigated and described in detail using aromatic thiones, but it was not until much later that a practical application was identified.

From 2009 to 2012 Adachi and coworkers published a series of papers reporting effective TADF molecular design strategies and competitive external quantum efficiencies (EQE) for green, orange, and blue OLEDs. These publications spiked interest in the topic and TADF compounds were soon considered a possible higher efficiency alternative to traditional fluorescent and phosphorescent compounds used in lighting and displays. TADF materials are being considered the third generation of OLEDs following fluorescent and phosphorescent based devices.

Mechanism
  The steps of the TADF process are displayed in the figure at right. In the electroluminescent process, which is observed in OLEDs, an applied voltage excites an electron into either a singlet or triplet state. Due to spin-coupling of light atoms, the total spin quantum number of the half-filled ground state electron and the excited state electron determine whether the electron system is a singlet or triplet state. If the electron system resides in a singlet state, the excited electron can undergo an allowed transition to the ground state in a prompt de-excitation on the order of about 10 nanoseconds, which is called fluorescence. If the electron system resides in a triplet state, the excited electron can undergo a forbidden de-excitation to the ground state on a much slower timescale on the order of about 1 microsecond, which is called phosphorescence. The thermally activated delayed fluorescence process occurs when an electron system in the triplet state undergoes reverse intersystem crossing to become a singlet state and then proceeds to fluoresce. In this fashion, when a TADF material becomes electronically excited it exhibits a prompt fluorescence and then a delayed fluorescence of similar wavelength.

Fluorescent materials can fundamentally only harvest energy from the singlet states, which make up 25% of electronic states due to spin statistics of light atoms. And due to out-coupling efficiency of ~20%, this leaves fluorescent materials with a maximum external quantum efficiency (EQE) of roughly 5%. Both phosphorescent and TADF materials have the ability to harvest energy from both the singlet and triplet states, theoretically allowing these materials to convert close to 100% of applied energy giving them a large advantage over fluorescent-based materials.

Spin statistics
Electronic states of materials used in light-emitting devices typically contain some type of spin coupling. In phosphorescent materials for example, heavy transition metals are used to take advantage of spin-orbit coupling. Most TADF materials however contain light organic atoms that incorporate spin coupling also known as angular momentum coupling. In this phenomenon, the quantum mechanical behavior of the excited and ground state electrons causes the combined state to have not only a combined total spin number S, but also a combined z-component of the spin Sz. Only when this spin coupling phenomenon is taken into account does a random excited state produce 3 possible electron combinations of total spin S=1 and 1 combination of total spin S=0. These then correspond to the observed 75% triplet states and 25% singlet states generated under electrical excitation.

Factors affecting TADF
Several key kinetic properties of TADF materials determine their ability to efficiently generate light through fluorescence while minimizing thermal loss pathways. The rate of reverse intersystem crossing, referred to as kRISC, must be relatively high compared to the rate of non-radiative triplet pathways. Most non-radiative triplet pathways like triplet-triplet annihilation, triplet quenching, or thermal decay occur on the order of 1 microsecond or longer compared to fluorescent emission which is typically on the order of 10 nanoseconds.

Another key property is the difference in the singlet and triplet state energy levels, called the ΔEST. The smaller this energy gap, the closer it becomes to the average thermal energy of surrounding molecules. Materials with a ΔEST approaching the order of available thermal energy (~25.6 meV at room temperature) can effectively undergo reverse intersystem crossing with little to no thermal loss pathways from the triplet state. Minimization of this energy gap is thus considered to be the most important factor in synthesizing potential TADF materials, as the TADF process can only occur when excited triplet states can readily convert to excited singlet states. The most effective strategies employed so far to minimize this energy gap are to synthesize molecules with donor and acceptor moieties spaced apart and twisted from each other on the same molecule. This effectively reduces the differences in the triplet and singlet states caused by spin coupling, which in turn reduces the ΔEST.

Chemical structure

The chemical structure of many commonly used TADF materials reflects the requirement to minimize the ΔEST by displaying a twisted structure where one part of the molecule is oriented on a plane parallel to the other. One of the most commonly used and successful TADF materials 2,4,5,6-Tetra(9H-carbazol-9-yl)isophthalonitrile (4CzIPN) contains this type of structure as the 
bottom and top carbazole groups can be viewed as flat and coplanar while the bottom left and bottom right carbazole groups can be thought of as coming into and out of the page. Because the pairs of carbazole groups are antiplanar, the differences between the HOMO and LUMO energy levels is minimized and the compound can more easily transfer between the triplet and singlet states.

Besides having an overall twisted conformation, high efficiency TADF materials contain both electron donating and electron accepting moieties and incorporate the same kind of planar twist between them. The interactions between these electron accepting and electron donating groups reduces the overlap of the HOMO and LUMO energy levels even further. Thus, many highly efficient TADF materials contain multiple carbazole groups as electron donors and can incorporate electron acceptors like triazines, sulfoxides, benzophenones, and spiro-based groups. The table below shows several examples of these compounds that have been reported to yield high efficiencies and low ΔEST.

Applications

Organic LEDs
 
The vast majority of research on TADF-based materials is focused on improving the efficiency and lifetime of TADF-based OLEDs. Organic light-emitting diodes or OLEDs have provided an alternative to traditional liquid-crystal display (LCD) displays due to their improved contrast, response time, wider viewing angle, and the possibility of making flexible displays. The first generation of OLEDs were based on fluorescent materials, which includes most OLED or AMOLED displays that are currently commercially available. The second generation of OLED materials employ phosphorescence light emission, which has the advantage of higher theoretical efficiency, but may still be lacking in other areas like the poor lifetimes seen in phosphorescent blue emitters.

Many consider the third generation of OLEDs to be TADF materials because of their already impressive quantum efficiencies and performance in small test devices. In practice, these newer TADF materials still have difficulties with solution processability in larger practical devices and many blue TADF molecules show poor performance and lifetimes. If these challenges can be addressed, TADF-based OLEDs show promise in replacing current LCD-based displays and OLED-based displays especially in curved televisions and flexible phone screen designs. In 2019, Taiwan-based Wisechip launched the world's first OLED display that uses TADF emitters (developed by Kyulux) in a Hyperfuorescence structure.

Fluorescence imaging
TADF-based materials have a unique advantage in some imaging techniques because of their longer lifetime over promptly fluorescing materials. For instance, the TADF exhibiting molecule ACRFLCN exhibits a strong sensitivity towards triplet oxygen making it an effective molecular oxygen sensor. The fluorescein derivative DCF-MPYM has shown success in the field of bioimaging as its long lifetime allows time-resolved fluorescence imaging in living cells. These tailored organic compounds are especially promising in bioimaging applications because of their low cytotoxicity compared to traditional compounds like lanthanide complexes.

Mechanoluminescence
TADF compounds can also be synthesized to exhibit a tunable color change based on the macroscopic particle size in powder form. In this way, these compounds can shift the color of their light emission through mechanical grinding in a phenomenon termed mechanoluminescence. Specifically, asymmetric compounds with diphenyl sulfoxide and phenothiazine moieties have been synthesized displaying linearly tunable mechanochromism due to a combination of fluorescence and TADF mechanisms. The compound named SCP shows dual emission peaks in its photoluminescence spectrum and changes from a green color to blue through mechanical grinding.

Challenges
Research into TADF materials has provided impressive results and devices made with these compounds have already achieved comparable small device performance and comparable quantum efficiencies. However, the synthesis and application of TADF materials still has multiple challenges to overcome before they become commercially viable. Likely the biggest hurdle is the difficulty in producing a blue light emitting TADF molecule with a reasonable lifetime. Creating a long lifetime blue OLED has been a challenge not only for TADF, but for fluorescent and phosphorescent materials as well due to the higher energy light degradation pathways. Another difficulty in producing efficient TADF materials is the lack of a reliable molecular design strategy. The combination of donating and accepting groups and the twisted molecular structure provide good fundamental starting concepts for new synthesis, but the difficulty in predicting HOMO and LUMO energy levels and the control of excitons through the material make it challenging to pinpoint which moieties will prove the most effective.

See also
Fluorescence
Phosphorescence
OLED
Light-emitting diode
Singlet state
Triplet state
Intersystem crossing

References

External links 

 TADF OLED emitters, introduction and market status
 What is thermally activated delayed fluorescence?

Lighting
Optical diodes
Organic electronics
Light-emitting diodes
Flexible electronics
Emerging technologies
Display devices